Bilston West railway station was a station built by the Oxford, Worcester and Wolverhampton Railway in 1854. It was situated on the Oxford-Worcester-Wolverhampton Line. The station eventually closed in 1962.

The station site has since disappeared under industrial and redevelopment as the Black Country Route and commercial premises have since been built on the former trackbed towards Priestfield although the trackbed can still be seen on an embankment before disappearing.

References

Further reading

Disused railway stations in Wolverhampton
Railway stations in Great Britain opened in 1854
Railway stations in Great Britain closed in 1962
Former Great Western Railway stations
1854 establishments in England